Birnbaum (German: "pear tree") is a German-language family name common among Ashkenazi Jews. Notable people with the surname include:

Adam Birnbaum (born 1979), American jazz pianist, composer, and arranger
Alfred Birnbaum (born 1955), American translator
Allan Birnbaum (1923-1976), American statistician
Amy Birnbaum (born 1975), American voice actress
Arved Birnbaum (1962–2021), German actor and director
Brigitte Birnbaum (born 1938), German author
 (born 1963 ), German musicologist and cultural manager
Daniel Birnbaum (born 1963), curator
Dara Birnbaum (born 1946), American feminist video artist
David Birnbaum (born 1956), Canadian politician
 (born 1931), German biologist
 (1942-2017), German cardiac surgeon
Eduard Birnbaum (1855-1920), German musicologist
Effi Birnbaum (born 1954), Israeli professional basketball coach
 (1892-1947),  Austrian pedagogue and psychologist
Frank Birnbaum (1922-2005), cantor
 (1890-1948), German dermatologist and university professor
George E. Birnbaum (born 1970), American international political consultant, one of "Arthur's Kid"
 (1912-1980), German lawyer , Ministerialbeamter and manager
Heinrich Birnbaum (1403-1473), monk
Henrik Birnbaum (1925–2002), American linguist and Slavist
 (1920-1943), German worker and resistance fighter against Nazism
 (1894-1982), German journalist and publicist
Jacob Birnbaum (1926-2014), human rights activist
Jeffrey Birnbaum (born 1955), American columnist
Jeremiah Birnbaum (born 1978), American singer/songwriter
 (1792-1877), German legal scholar and playwright 
 (1904-1978), German non-fiction - writer and novelist
 Johann Birnbaum (1763-1832), German jurist
Karl Birnbaum (1878–1950), German neurologist
 (1829-1907), German agronomist 
 (1839-1887), German chemist 
 (born 1955), Austrian - American film director and producer and photographer 
Linda Birnbaum (born 1946), toxicologist and director of the National Institute for Environmental Health Sciences
 (born 1997), Austrian ice hockey player
 (1872-1959), German National Liberal politician ( DVP )
 (born 1970), German actor and musical actor
Menachem Birnbaum (1893-1944), book illustrator and portrait painter
 (born 1948), Israeli educator
Morton Birnbaum (1926–2005), American physician
Nathan Birnbaum (1864-1937), Jewish philosopher
George Burns (born Nathan Birnbaum, 1896-1996), American singer and actor
 (born 1977), German actor
Norman Birnbaum (1926–2019), American sociologist
 (born 1986), German actress and entrepreneur
Philip Birnbaum (1904-1988), American translator of Jewish prayer book
Roger Birnbaum (born 1950), American film producer
Solomon Birnbaum, Yiddish linguist and son of Nathan Birnbaum
Stephen Birnbaum (1937–1991), American travel writer and editor
Steve Birnbaum (born 1991), American Major League Soccer player
Uriel Birnbaum (1894-1956), painter, caricaturist, writer and poet
 (born 1933), German theater and film director
 (1893-1987), German theologian and university professor
 (1897-1925), German physicist
 (1895-1980), German politician of the SPD
Yaakov (Jacob) Birnbaum (1926-2014), human rights activist
Zdzisław Birnbaum (1878-1921), Polish violinist and conductor
Zygmunt Wilhelm Birnbaum (1903-2000), Polish-American mathematician and statistician

See also
Barenboim, Yiddish form
Bernbaum
Berenbaum
Birnbaumins

German-language surnames
Ashkenazi surnames